Cymothoe collinsi is a butterfly in the family Nymphalidae. It is found in northern  Tanzania. The habitat consists of montane forests at an altitude of about 1,800 meters.

References

Butterflies described in 1980
Cymothoe (butterfly)
Endemic fauna of Tanzania
Butterflies of Africa